The 2005–06 Malaysia Super League also known as the TM Liga Super for sponsorship reasons is the third season of the Malaysia Super League, the top-tier professional football league in Malaysia. The season was held from 3 December 2005 and concluded on 23 May 2006.

Summary
The winner this season was Negeri Sembilan NAZA. Negeri Sembilan NAZA garnered 40 points from 21 matches and won the title despite scoring less goals than all the other teams in the league except Pahang, who finished second from bottom. With this title, they finally erased the painful memory of losing the 1996 M-League crown having topped the table for most of that season.

Their nearest rivals were TM Melaka with 33 points. Having been in the title contention for most of the season, they were the best positioned club side in Liga Super history after Public Bank in 2004.

Perak's Keita Mandjou was the season's top scorer with 17 goals. Three matches, including Selangor's 6–1 hammering at the hands of Perlis, featured seven goals, and these were the season's highest scoring matches.

Relegation playoffs
As a result of the FAM decision to expand the league to 14 teams, the relegation playoffs were held on 18 June 2006. Six of the league's 14 places were up for grabs in this competition. Pahang and Selangor qualified for this competition by virtue of being the lowest placed Super League teams. Top teams from the Premier League also qualified for this competition (except for Kedah and Melaka, who were automatically promoted by virtue of being Premier League champions). The first round of matches saw Sarawak, Terengganu, Selangor and DPMM promoted. The second round of matches saw Johor FC and Pahang promoted.

Teams

Changes from last season
Promoted from the Premier League
 Negeri Sembilan
 Selangor

Relegated to the Premier League
 Sabah

Disqualification
 Public Bank

Stadiums and locations
Note: Table lists in alphabetical order.

League table

Relegation play-offs
All times are (UTC+8).

First round

First leg

Second leg

6–2 on aggregate. Sarawak won on aggregate and are promoted to the Super League, while Sabah qualified to final round.

7–4 on aggregate. Selangor won on aggregate and remain in the Super League, while Johor qualified to final round.

2–0 on aggregate. Terengganu won on aggregate and are promoted to the Super League, while Sabah qualified to final round.

2–1 on aggregate. DPMM won on aggregate and are promoted to the Super League, while Pahang qualified to final round.

Final round

First leg

Second leg

3-4 on aggregate. Pahang won on aggregate and remain at Super League, Sabah remain at 2nd League

5-2 on aggregate. Johor FC won on aggregate and remain in the Super League, Selangor PKNS remain at 2nd League

Season statistics

Top scorers

References

Malaysia Super League seasons
1
Malaysia
Malaysia